Theodore Thye (August 26, 1890 – March 22, 1966) was an American wrestler, promotor and manager in the United States.

Professional wrestling career 
During his career he worked with Emile Czaja and Ed "Strangler" Lewis. Thye was a multiple time winner of the World Light Heavyweight Championship. He was also the World Light Heavyweight Championship (Australian version) by defeating Clarence Eklund. He also won the Pacific Coast Middleweight Championship in 1920 and the Pacific Coast Light Heavyweight Championship in 1922. He defeated Billy Meeske in 1924. Thye wrestled under Stadiums Limited for a period of time.

Pacific Northwest Wrestling started in the early 1920s when Thye, a former world middleweight and world light-heavyweight (Australian version) wrestling champion, came to Portland with plans to promote both boxing and wrestling.  Ted served as a booking agent for Lou Thesz at the Dominion Wrestling Union.

Personal life
Thye was the brother of Edward John Thye

Championships and accomplishments
 Stadiums Limited
 World Light Heavyweight Championship (Australian version) (2 times, inaugural)
 Western Athletic Club
 World Light Heavyweight Championship (Pacific Coast version) (3 times)
 Pacific Coast Middleweight Championship (1 time, inaugural)
 Pacific Northwest Light Heavyweight Championship (1 time)
 Pacific Northwest Middleweight Championship (1 time)
 Pacific Northwest Welterweight Championship (1 time)
 Other titles
 World Middleweight Championship (1 time)
 World Middleweight Championship (Los Angeles version) (1 time)
 World Light Heavyweight Championship (1 time)

References 
General
 
 
 

Specific

External links 
 Ted Thye at Cagematch.net
 Ted Thye at Wrestlingdata.com

1890 births
1966 deaths
20th-century professional wrestlers
American male professional wrestlers
Professional wrestlers from South Dakota
People from Brown County, South Dakota